Calcium 5'-ribonucleotides is listed as E number reference E634. This food additive is banned in Australia and New Zealand.

References

E-number additives
Ribosides